WSIU (91.9 FM, "Powered by You") is a radio station broadcasting a news/talk/information and classical music format. Licensed to Carbondale, Illinois, the station serves Southern Illinois. The station is currently owned by Southern Illinois University Carbondale and features programming from American Public Media, National Public Radio, and Public Radio Exchange. Programming originating from WSIU includes Celtic Connections, a Celtic music show.

WSIU's programming is also heard on WUSI 90.3 FM in Olney, Illinois and WVSI 88.9 FM in Mount Vernon, Illinois

WSIU first took to the air on September 15, 1958, as WSRV (Southern's Radio Voice).  It became WSIU in 1960.

References

External links
 
 

SIU
News and talk radio stations in the United States
NPR member stations
SIU
Southern Illinois University Carbondale
Radio stations established in 1958
1958 establishments in Illinois